Trois-Rivières Airport  is located near the city of Trois-Rivières, Quebec, Canada.

The airport is classified as an airport of entry by Nav Canada and is staffed by the Canada Border Services Agency (CBSA). CBSA officers at this airport can handle general aviation aircraft only, with no more than 15 passengers.

The threshold of runway 05 was extended towards the south of the airport.

References

External links
Trois-Rivières Airport

Transport in Trois-Rivières
Certified airports in Mauricie
Buildings and structures in Trois-Rivières